Menemerus pallescens is a jumping spider species in the genus Menemerus that lives in Yemen.

References

Salticidae
Invertebrates of the Arabian Peninsula
Spiders of Asia
Spiders described in 2007
Taxa named by Wanda Wesołowska